Damon Thompson (born 5 March 1983) is a retired Barbadian track and field athlete who competed in high jump.

Personal best

Achievements

References

External links
 

1983 births
Living people
Commonwealth Games competitors for Barbados
Athletes (track and field) at the 2002 Commonwealth Games
Barbadian high jumpers
Competitors at the 2006 Central American and Caribbean Games